is a Japanese actor. He has appeared in more than 60 films since 1997.

Selected filmography

Film

Television

References

External links 

1975 births
Living people
Japanese male film actors
Japanese male television actors
Male actors from Tokyo
20th-century Japanese male actors
21st-century Japanese male actors